Ernest Gaden Western "Dick" Wood (22 November 1906 – 5 July 1984) was a member of the Queensland Legislative Assembly.

Biography
Wood was born in Toowoomba, Queensland, the son of George Orme Western Wood and his wife Helen Portia Rosalind (née Davidson). He was educated at the Rangeville State School and Toowoomba Grammar School and after finishing his education worked in a variety of jobs in Queensland and the Northern Territory. From 1952 he was a small crops farmer at Wellington Point for the next 24 years.

On 22 September 1938 he married Mary Tudor Hill and together had two son and two daughters. Wood died in July 1984 and was buried in the Cleveland Cemetery.

Public career
Wood, representing the Country Party, won the seat of Logan at the 1966 Queensland state election, defeating his main opponent, William Ware of the Labor Party. He represented the electorate for three years before his defeat in 1969.

He was a Councilor on the Redland Shire Council from 1958 and Chairman of the shire for seven consecutive terms. His grandfather, Western Wood was a member of the Queensland Legislative Council in the 1860s and his great-grandfather, also named Western Wood was a member of the House of Commons of the United Kingdom.

References

Members of the Queensland Legislative Assembly
1906 births
1984 deaths
Australian Labor Party members of the Parliament of Queensland
People from Redland City
20th-century Australian politicians